Minuscule 209 (in the Gregory-Aland numbering), δ 457 and α 1581 (Soden), is a Greek minuscule manuscript of the New Testament, on parchment. Paleographically it has been assigned to the 14th century, with an exception to the Book of Revelation which was added to the codex in the 15th century. It has marginalia.

Description 

The codex contains the whole text of the New Testament on 411 parchment leaves (size ). The text is written in one column per page, in 27 lines per page.

The text of the Gospels is also divided according to the smaller Ammonian Sections (in Mark 236 Sections). There are no references to the Eusebian Canons.

It contains the Euthalian Apparatus in the Catholic epistles, and Prolegomena to the Apocalypse.

Text 

The Greek text of the codex is a representative of the Caesarean text-type in the Gospels and the Byzantine text-type in rest books of the New Testament. Aland placed it in Category III in Gospels and in Book of Revelation. The text of the rest books of New Testament of this codex belongs to Category V.

The text of the Gospels is close to minuscule 205. But they are different in the Acts and the Epistles. It is a member of the textual family f1.

Matthew 10:12 (see Luke 10:5)
 It reads λεγοντες ειρηνη τω οικω τουτω (say peace to be this house) after αυτην. The reading was deleted by the first corrector, but the second corrector restored it. The reading is used by manuscripts: Codex Sinaiticus, Bezae, Regius, Washingtonianus, Koridethi, other manuscript of f 1, 22, 1010 (1424), it vgcl.

History 

The manuscript once belonged to Cardinal Bessarion († 1472), who had it with him at the Council of Florence in 1439, and wrote many notes in it.

Hoskier reported in 1929 that Aldus used it to correct the Erasman text in his Greek New Testament of 1518.

It was examined and described by Birch, Engelbreth, Fleck, Rinck, and Burgon. C. R. Gregory saw it in 1886.

It is currently housed at the Biblioteca Marciana (Fondo ant. 10), at Venice.

See also 
 List of New Testament minuscules
 Biblical manuscript
 Textual criticism

References

Further reading 

 G. F. Rinck, Lucubratio critica in Acta Apostolorum, Epistolas catholicas et Paulinas, Sumtu Fel. Schneideri: Basilae 1830.
 
 See Family 1

Greek New Testament minuscules
11th-century biblical manuscripts